The 2007 Waterford Senior Hurling Championship was the 107th staging of the Waterford Senior Hurling Championship since its establishment by the Waterford County Board in 1897.

Mount Sion were the defending champions.

On 4 November 2007, Ballyduff Upper won the championship after a 1-18 to 1-14 defeat of Ballygunner in the final. This was their third championship title overall and their first title since 1987.

Results

Final

References

Waterford Senior Hurling Championship
Waterford Senior Hurling Championship